Luuka District is a district in Eastern Uganda.

Location
Luuka District is bordered by Buyende District in the north, Kaliro District to the northeast, Iganga District to the southeast, Mayuge District to the south, Jinja District to the southwest and Kamuli District to the northwest. The coordinates of the district are:00 42N, 33 18E.

Overview
Luuka District was created by Act of Parliament and became functional on 1 July 2010.
 Prior to then, the district was Luuka County in Iganga District. In Kisoga tradition, Luuka is one of the five traditional principalities of the Kingdom of Busoga. According to legend, Luuka was founded around 1737 A.D. and became a part of the British protectorate in Busoga in 1896 A.D. Its traditional ruler is known as the Tabingwa. The district is made up of the following sub-counties: (a) Bukanga (b) Bukooma (c) Bulongo (d) Ikumbya (e) Irongo (f) Nawampiti and (g) Waibuga.

Population
In 1991, the national population census estimated the district population at about 130,400. The national census in 2002 estimated the district population to be approximately 185,500. In 2012, the district population was estimated at about 260,900.

See also
 Luuka
 Busoga sub-region
 Districts of Uganda

References

 
Busoga
Districts of Uganda
Eastern Region, Uganda